Carl David Wetzel (born December 12, 1938) is an American retired professional ice hockey goaltender who played 7 games in the National Hockey League for the Detroit Red Wings and Minnesota North Stars between 1964 and 1968. He also played 1 game in the World Hockey Association with the Minnesota Fighting Saints during the 1972–73 season. Internationally Wetzel played for the American national team at the 1967 and 1971 World Championships.

Playing career
In November 1957, as an 18-year-old, Wetzel played in relief of John Henderson for the Whitby Dunlops against the reigning Olympic gold medalist Soviet national team at Maple Leaf Gardens. This was the first time the Russians played in Canada, and Wetzel backstopped the Dunlops to a 7–2 victory. The Dunlops team featured Harry Sinden, Charlie Burns, and Sid Smith. At the time, Wetzel was the goalie for the Hamilton Tiger Cubs of the Ontario Hockey Association and played against the Dunlops prior to the game against the Russians. Whitby's coach, Wren Blair, took note of Wetzel's play, and upon a knee injury suffered by Whitby goaltender John Henderson, coach Blair called upon the Wetzel to represent Canada against the Soviet Union. It was during the season with the Tiger Cubs that Wetzel also played in the OHA all-star game against Denis DeJordy, Chico Maki, Matt Ravlich, Pat Stapleton, and John McKenzie, all of whom later played in the NHL.

Wetzel played in the NHL during the Original Six era with the Detroit Red Wings, where he competed as the starting goalie with Roger Crozier in 1964, seeing action in two games. Wetzel was one of two Americans on an NHL roster during the season, and was the only American goaltender. The other American on an NHL roster for the 1964–65 season was Tommy Williams, a right winger for the Boston Bruins. He later won the Calder Cup, the championship of the minor American Hockey League, with the Rochester Americans in 1967.

Wetzel finished his major league career in 1972–73 with the Minnesota Fighting Saints of the World Hockey Association after spending the previous season in the Austrian Hockey League with EC Kitzbühel. He would later serve as an assistant coach under Herb Brooks with the Minnesota North Stars in 1987–88.

International play
Internationally, Wetzel was the starting goalie for the American national team at the 1967 World Championships in Vienna. He was voted best goaltender of the tournament, an award earned by four other Americans in the history of the IIHF (Don Rigazio, 1955; Willard Ikola, 1956; Jack McCartan, 1960; and Ty Conklin 2004). He also competed at the 1971 World Championships.

Career statistics

Regular season and playoffs

International

External links
 

1938 births
Living people
American expatriate sportspeople in Austria
American men's ice hockey goaltenders
Cleveland Barons (1937–1973) players
Detroit Red Wings players
Edmonton Flyers (WHL) players
Fort Wayne Komets players
Houston Apollos players
Ice hockey coaches from Michigan
Ice hockey people from Detroit
Memphis South Stars players
Minnesota Fighting Saints players
Minnesota North Stars coaches
Minnesota North Stars players
Pittsburgh Hornets players
Quebec Aces (AHL) players
Rochester Americans players
Spokane Comets players
Sportspeople from Detroit
Sudbury Wolves (EPHL) players